Luna X 2000 is a German unmanned surveillance and reconnaissance aerial vehicle in service with the Bundeswehr (German Army) and produced by EMT Penzberg of Germany.

The UAV is launched with a simple bungee catapult and then follows a preprogrammed course, that can be altered in flight if necessary. After its mission it automatically lands with the help of a parachute and impact dampers.

Luna X UAVs are in use by German KFOR forces since 2000 and are also used by German troops in Afghanistan.

In mid-2009 the German Army ordered another 4 systems with a total of 40 UAVs.

The Pakistan Navy signed a contract on the 27 June 2012 with EMT for purchase of LUNA UAV Systems.

Houthi fighters reportedly shot down a Luna drone in Yemen around February 12, 2019.

In 2019 the German Army began the replacement of Luna and Rheinmetall KZO with the new Luna NG, which has much increased capabilities.

Specifications
 Propulsion: two cylinder two stroke engine, driving pusher propeller
 Typical speed: 
 Service ceiling:  AMSL
 Endurance: 6 hours (8 hours optional)
 Length: 
 Wingspan: 
 Take-off weight: < 
 Data Link range: >  (dependent on line of sight)

References

External links
Luna UAV System  @ EMT (manufacturer)
Nahaufklärungs-Austattung LUNA X (in German) @ deutschesheer.de (Official homepage of the German Army)
LUNA X-2000 @ defense update
LUNA Aerial Reconnaissance and Surveillance UAV
@Luna UAS for Pakistan Navy.

Unmanned military aircraft of Germany
German military reconnaissance aircraft
Aircraft manufactured in Germany